Metalworking terminology